Genesis Transport Service, Inc., also known as Genesis Transport or simply Genesis, is a provincial bus company in the Philippines, operating routes connecting Metro Manila to Central Luzon and Northern Luzon.

Etymology and logo

The name of the bus company Genesis is a biblical word meaning "the beginning".

Half of the letter "G" in its logo shows the Philippine map, representing the center of the company's operations.

History
Genesis started its operations in 1991, with a shuttle bus between Paskuhan village and the malls in Metro Manila. From there, it grew to owning three buses, which it operated with a crew of six people, and two partners. In 2007, Genesis Transport had a total of 300 buses, servicing routes to key destinations in Central Luzon; including Tarlac, Bataan, Cabanatuan, Aurora, and Baguio.

In 2009, the company was one of the sponsors of the 5th Philippine Bird Festival in Bataan.

Subsidiaries

Manila Genesis Charters & Tours, Inc. 
Genesis Transport has opened a new subsidiary, known as Manila Genesis Charters & Tours, Inc., in 2006 as a Philippine corporation and is duly registered with the Securities and Exchange Commission.  This company is offering chartered tourist service and shuttle service in Clark Special Economic Zone in Pampanga.

JoyBus 
In August 2010, Genesis Transport started a new service called JoyBus - a Wi-Fi-equipped, 28-seater executive coach with comfort room initially catering non-stop transport to Baler, Aurora. In April 2012, JoyBus extended its service from Cubao - Baguio, Avenida - Baguio, NAIA - Baguio, Pasay - Baguio and Balanga - Baguio.

North Genesis 
In 2010, Genesis Transport Service, Inc. announced its partnership between Dagupan Bus Co., Inc. and Saulog Transit Inc., but in early 2015, the Baguio - Cubao route was acquired by Genesis Transport and rebranded into North Genesis.

Other 
They also took control of Aurora Bus Lines, which cater to Aurora Province. The Aurora Bus Lines terminal is in Cabanatuan

Fleet

Current
Daewoo BV115 (2009–present)
Daewoo BH117H (2018–present)
Golden Dragon XML6103 (2011–present)
Golden Dragon XML6122 (2017–present)
Golden Dragon XML6127 (2014–present)
Guilin Daewoo GDW6121 (2014–present)
Hino Grandecho Series 2 (2015–present)
Yutong ZK6119H92 (2015–present)
Yutong ZK6122HD9 (2014–present)
Yutong ZK6107HA (2012–present)
Yutong ZK6119HA (2010–present)
DMMC DM12 (2016–present)
Volvo B7R Autodelta (2017–present)
Volvo B8R Autodelta (2018–present)
Zhongtong Magnate (2017–present)
Zhongtong Elegance (2019 facelift; 2019–present)
Zhongtong Elegance (2015 pre-facelift; 2016–present)

Former
Pilipinas Hino RK (1995–2014)
Mercedes-Benz OH1625L (1997–2013)
SR Nissan Diesel NDPC Euro (1996–2013)
SR Exfoh Hi-Deck MAN 18.310 (2003–2016)
Santarosa Nissan Diesel JA450SSN (2005–2019)
Santarosa SR NV620 (2008–2019)
AMC Tourist Star AC RE MAN 18-280HOCL (2007–2016)

Fare Classes

 Ordinary Fare (61 or 66 seater)
 Regular Air Conditioned (41, 45, 49 or 53 seater)
 Deluxe (45 seater; 2 x 2 seating for Baler and Baguio trips only as of today)
First Class (28 seater; 2 x 1 seating for Baler and Baguio trips only as of today)

Fleet Numbering

The fleet number are uses 5 or 6 digits and the first 3 digits are always uses 818 in all buses, except for some P2P buses. (eg. 818** & 818***)

Destinations

Metro Manila
 Avenida, Manila
 Cubao, Quezon City
 Pasay

Provincial Destinations (from Metro Manila)
 Baguio (uses North Genesis via SCTEX-Luisita Exit and JoyBus via TPLEX Rosario Exit)
 Ilagan, Isabela (uses JoyBus)
 Cauayan, Isabela (uses JoyBus)
 Echague, Isabela (uses JoyBus)
 Tarlac City, Tarlac
 Gerona, Tarlac
 Clark International Airport, Pampanga (also P2P Bus Services Routes)
 Guagua, Pampanga
 Lubao, Pampanga
 Mabalacat City, Pampanga (Dau Bus Terminal)
 San Fernando City, Pampanga
 Balanga, Bataan
 Mariveles, Bataan
 Baler, Aurora
 Casiguran, Aurora
 Cabanatuan, Nueva Ecija
 Pantabangan, Nueva Ecija
 Rizal, Nueva Ecija
 San Jose, Nueva Ecija

Inter-provincial
San Fernando City, Pampanga - San Jose City via Dau/SCTEX La Paz/Zaragzoga/Santa Rosa and Cabanatuan.
San Fernando City, Pampanga - Tarlac City, Tarlac via Dau/SCTEX/Concepcion/Capas and San Miguel.
Baguio - Mariveles via Dau and San Fernando City, Pampanga & via SCTEX Luisita Exit.
Baguio - Clark Airport via TPLEX used Joybus and Genesis Transport P2P Route.
Baguio - Ilagan via Cauayan uses JoyBus and Genesis Transport P2P Route.
Baguio - Echague via Bayombong uses JoyBus and Genesis Transport P2P Route.
Cabanatuan - Baler via San Luis or Maria Aurora (placards and LEDs displayed as Maria)
Mariveles - SM Cabanatuan via Roman Superhighway, Jose Abad Santos Avenue and Maharlika Highway
Lubao - Clark Airport P2P Route

Images

See also
 List of bus companies of the Philippines
 Dagupan Bus Co, Inc.
 Saulog Transit Inc.
Five Star Bus Company Co, Inc.

References

External links

Genesis Transport Website

Bus companies of the Philippines
Companies based in Quezon City